Gloeophyllum protractum is a species of fungus belonging to the family Gloeophyllaceae.

It is native to Eurasia and Northern America.

References

Gloeophyllales